The Worcester Sharks  were a professional ice hockey team in the American Hockey League (AHL) that played from 2006 to 2015.  Affiliated with the National Hockey League's San Jose Sharks and located in Worcester, Massachusetts, the Sharks played their home games at the DCU Center.

History
On November 9, 2004, the St. Louis Blues announced the sale of the Worcester IceCats to the owners of their ECHL affiliate, the Peoria Rivermen. The new owners moved the franchise to Peoria, Illinois, for the 2005–06 season. Shocked by the loss of the IceCats, the people of Worcester bargained with several National Hockey League (NHL) franchises, trying to bring hockey back to the city. On January 6, 2006, the San Jose Sharks announced they were moving their AHL affiliate, the Cleveland Barons, to Worcester, Massachusetts, and the Worcester Sharks played their first home game on October 14, 2006, in front of a sold-out 7,230 fans in a shootout loss to the Portland Pirates. The Sharks qualified for the playoffs in their inaugural season, but were eliminated in six games by the Manchester Monarchs in the first round.

The Sharks' main rivals were the Providence Bruins, the genesis of which dates back to IceCats' days.

The Sharks were well represented in the 2010 Winter Olympics held in Vancouver, with former Sharks Joe Pavelski (played for the United States), Douglas Murray (represented Sweden) along with the goaltending tandem from the franchise's first two years with Thomas Greiss and Dimitri Patzold played for Germany.

On November 1, 2009, head coach Roy Sommer became only the fourth coach in AHL history to record 400 wins. On January 14, 2011, Sommer was behind the Sharks bench for his 1,000th regular-season game as an AHL head coach, becoming just the fourth man in AHL history to reach that milestone. On February 11, 2012, Sommer became the fourth coach in AHL history to record 500 wins with a 3–2 shootout win over the Hershey Bears.

Relocation to San Jose
On January 26, 2015, it was reported that the Sharks would move to San Jose and share SAP Center at San Jose with their parent club, the San Jose Sharks. These reports were confirmed with the Sharks' official announcement on January 29.  On April 2, 2015, the team was announced as the San Jose Barracuda.

Worcester did not initially receive an ECHL team to replace the relocated AHL team, unlike the other markets with relocated AHL teams in 2015, such as Manchester, New Hampshire, Norfolk, Virginia, and Glens Falls, New York. On February 8, 2016, the ECHL announced Worcester would be home to an expansion team, set to begin play for the 2017–18 season. The team is owned by Cliff Rucker, with Toby O'Brien serving as president and general manager. The team name was revealed on April 3 to be the Worcester Railers.

This market was previously served by:
Worcester Warriors (1954–1956) - members of the Eastern Hockey League (1954–55) and Atlantic Hockey League (1955–56)
Worcester IceCats (1994–2005) - affiliated with the St. Louis Blues

Broadcasters
Radio
Eric Lindquist - Play-by-Play

Television
Eric Lindquist - Play-by-Play
Kevin Shea - Color Commentary

Season-by-season results

Records as of April 21, 2015.

Players

Team captains
Graham Mink, 2007–2008
Ryan Vesce, 2008–2010
Jay Leach, 2010–2011
Mike Moore, 2011–2012
John McCarthy, 2012–2013
Rob Davison, 2013–2014
Bryan Lerg, 2014–2015

All-Star Classic representatives

Mathieu Darche, 2007 Canadian
Mike Iggulden, 2008 Canadian
Derek Joslin, 2009 Canadian
Ryan Vesce, 2009 PlanetUSA
Logan Couture, 2010 Canadian
Alex Stalock, 2010 PlanetUSA
Justin Braun, 2011 Eastern
Jonathan Cheechoo, 2011 Eastern
Matt Irwin, 2012 Eastern
Bracken Kearns, 2013 Eastern
Matt Taormina, 2015 Eastern

Notable alumni
List of Worcester Sharks alumni who played  in the National Hockey League:

Riley Armstrong 
Steve Bernier 
Justin Braun 
Adam Burish 
Joe Callahan 
Matt Carle 
Tom Cavanagh 
Jonathan Cheechoo 
Logan Couture 
Mathieu Darche 
Rob Davison 
Aaron Dell
Dylan DeMelo 
Jason Demers 

Andrew Desjardins 
Scott Ferguson 
Benn Ferriero 
Barclay Goodrow 
Josh Gorges 
Thomas Greiss 
Dwight Helminen 
Tomas Hertl 
Carter Hutton 
Mike Iggulden 
Matt Irwin 
Derek Joslin 
Melker Karlsson 
Lukas Kaspar 

Tyler Kennedy 
Tim Kennedy 
Claude Lemieux 
Brandon Mashinter 
John McCarthy 
Jamie McGinn 
Frazer McLaren 
Kyle McLaren 
Torrey Mitchell 
Mike Moore 
Mirco Mueller 
Douglas Murray 
Sandis Ozolinsh 

Dimitri Patzold 
Joe Pavelski 
Tomas Plihal 
Devin Setoguchi 
James Sheppard 
Alex Stalock 
Brad Staubitz 
Matt Tennyson 
Patrick Traverse 
Ryan Vesce 
Marc-Edouard Vlasic 
Tommy Wingels 
Steven Zalewski

Player records

All-time regular season leaders
Games Played: Nick Petrecki, John McCarthy,  277
Goals: John McCarthy, 63
Assists: Tom Cavanagh, 92
Points: John McCarthy, 151
PIM: Frazer McLaren, 577
Wins: Thomas Greiss, 74
Losses: Thomas Greiss, 60
Shutouts: Alex Stalock, Aaron Dell 4
Lowest GAA : Aaron Dell, 2.06

Individual regular season
Most Goals: Mathieu Darche, 35 (2006–07)
Most Assists: Danny Groulx, 52 (2009–10)
Most Points: Mathieu Darche, 80 (2006–07)
Most Penalty Minutes: Matt Pelech, 238 (2012–13)
Most Power-Play Goals: Mathieu Darche, 16 (2006–07)
Most Shorthanded Goals: Ryan Vesce, 3 (2008–09)
Most Appearances: Alex Stalock, 61 (2009–10)
Most Minutes Played: Alex Stalock, 3,534 (2009–10)
Most Wins: Alex Stalock, 39 (2009–10)
Most Losses: Thomas Greiss, 24 (2008–09)
Most Shutouts: Alex Stalock, 4 (2009–10) Aaron Dell, 4 (2014-15)
Lowest GAA (min. 25 games): Aaron Dell, 2.06 (2014–15)
Highest Save Percentage (min. 25 games): Aaron Dell, .927 (2014–15)

All-time playoff leaders
Games Played: 14 players tied, 12
Goals: Patrick Traverse/Jamie McGinn/Andrew Desjardins, 4
Assists: Riley Armstrong, 11 
Points: Riley Armstrong, 14

Franchise firsts
First Game & Win: October 6, 2006. Worcester Sharks 4, Portland Pirates 3 [SO]
Franchise First Goal: October 6, 2006. Worcester Sharks 4, Portland Pirates 3 [SO]. Goal scored by Mathieu Darche
Franchise First Shutout: January 11, 2008 by Dimitri Patzold. Worcester Sharks 3, Providence Bruins 0.
Franchise First Hat Trick: December 22, 2006 by Mathieu Darche. Worcester Sharks 6, Manchester Monarchs 4.
Franchise Largest Crowd: February 24, 2012. 10,170 Providence Bruins 5, Worcester Sharks 3.

Franchise lasts
Last Game: May 1, 2015. Worcester Sharks 4, Hershey Bears 10 [Game 4, Round 1 of Playoffs]
Last Win: April 29, 2015. Worcester Sharks 4, Hershey Bears 1 [Game 3, Round 1 of Playoffs]
Franchise Last Goal: May 1, 2015. Worcester Sharks 4, Hershey Bears 10 [Game 4, Round 1 of Playoffs] Goal scored by Matt Taormina assisted by Oleksuk, Langlois.
Franchise Last Shutout: April 7, 2015 by Aaron Dell. Worcester Sharks 1, Portland Pirates 0
Franchise Last Hat Trick: February 27, 2015 by Evan Trupp. Saint John's IceCaps 3, Worcester Sharks 6
Franchise Last Home Game: April 25, 2015 Hershey Bears 3, Worcester Sharks 1 [Game 2, Round 1 of Playoffs] Attendance:4,045

Franchise scoring leaders
These are the top-ten point-scorers in franchise history.
''Note: Pos = Position; GP = Games played; G = Goals; A = Assists; Pts = Points;

Head coaches
Roy Sommer, 2006–2015

References

External links
 Worcester Sharks Supporters Website
 Worcester Sharks Booster Club

 
2006 establishments in Massachusetts
2015 disestablishments in Massachusetts
Defunct ice hockey teams in the United States
Defunct sports teams in Massachusetts
Ice hockey clubs established in 2006
Ice hockey clubs disestablished in 2015
Ice hockey teams in Worcester, Massachusetts
San Jose Sharks minor league affiliates